Androsace vesulensis is a plant species in the family Primulaceae.

Taxonomy
Androsace vesulensis was named after Monte Viso, a mountain in the southwestern Italian Alps, where the holotype was collected.

Description
It is made of loose to slightly compact rosettes. The flowers are always white,  in diameter. It typically flowers from June to August.

Habitat and distribution
This species is endemic to Monte Viso and neighboring ophiolite summits (Italy and France).

References 

vesulensis
Alpine flora
Flora of the Alps